Counting On (formerly Jill & Jessa: Counting On) is an American reality television show that aired on the cable channel TLC from 2015-2020. A spin-off show of 19 Kids and Counting, it features the Duggar family: Jessa Seewald, Jinger Vuolo, Joy-Anna Forsyth, and fifteen of their sixteen siblings, as well as their parents Jim Bob and Michelle. The show was created in the wake of the Josh Duggar molestation controversy and subsequent cancellation of 19 Kids and Counting.

The show follows the lives of the older Duggar offspring, with the early episodes focusing specifically on Jill Dillard and Jessa Seewald. After its first season, the show expanded to include the rest of the Duggar siblings and their respective families.  The series was cancelled in 2021, due to Josh Duggar's arrest.

Cast
Jana Duggar
John-David and Abbie Duggar, with their daughter Grace
Jessa and Ben Seewald, with their children: Spurgeon, Henry, and Ivy 
Jinger and Jeremy Vuolo, with their daughter Felicity
Joe and Kendra Duggar, with their children: Garrett and Addison 
Josiah and Lauren Duggar, with their daughter Bella
Joy-Anna and Austin Forsyth, with their son Gideon 
Jim Bob, Michelle Duggar and their ten younger children: Jedidiah, Jeremiah, Jason, James, Justin, Jackson, Johannah, Jennifer, Jordyn and Josie; plus the couple's great nephew Tyler
Anna Duggar and her children: Mackynzie, Michael, Marcus, Meredith, Mason and Maryella
Jill and Derick Dillard, with their son Israel
Mary Leona Duggar (née Lester), the mother of Jim Bob. She died on June 9, 2019 from drowning at age 78.

Series overview

References

2010s American reality television series
2020s American reality television series
2015 American television series debuts
2020 American television series endings
Duggar family
English-language television shows
Television shows filmed in Arkansas
TLC (TV network) original programming
American television spin-offs
Reality television spin-offs
Television series about families